The D-1 visa is a non-immigrant visa which allows travel to the United States for those serving as a crewman on marine vessel or aircraft, who will depart the US on the same vessel on which they arrived. Those who will depart on a different vessel would normally instead qualify for a D-2 visa. 

Individuals are not eligible for a D-1 visa if their vessel is in dry dock, is a fishing vessel, they are a coasting officer, they are serving on a private yacht, or if they are destined for the outer continental shelf. The maximum duration of stay is 29 days.

D-1 visas may not be issue when a strike or lockout is present unless the individual has been employed at least one year, been employed in the last three months, and will continue to be employed.

References

External links
8 CFR 214.2 (m) Title 8, Code of Federal Regulations
Dubai Visa For Shopping & Issuance Of Instant Travel Visa
Visa wait times Visa wait times at consulates around the world
Esta Visa Application Electronic System for Travel Authorization

United States visas by type
United States immigration law